In Latin script typography, roman is one of the three main kinds of historical type, alongside blackletter and italic. Sometimes called normal, it is distinct from these two for its upright style (relative to the calligraphy-inspired italic) and its simplicity (relative to blackletter).

During the early Renaissance, roman (in the form of Antiqua) and italic type were used separately. Today, roman and italic type are mixed, and most typefaces are composed of both an upright roman style and an associated italic or oblique style.

History
Roman type was modelled from a European scribal manuscript style of the 15th century, based on the pairing of inscriptional capitals used in ancient Rome with Carolingian minuscules developed in the Holy Roman Empire. 

Early roman typefaces show a variety of designs, for instance resembling what would now be considered blackletter. Printers and typefounders such as Nicolas Jenson and Aldus Manutius in Venice and later Robert Estienne in France codified the modern characteristics of Roman type, for instance an 'h' with a nearly straight right leg, serifs on the outside of the capital 'M' and 'N', and 'e' with level cross stroke, by the 1530s.

Use today
Popular roman typefaces include Bembo, Baskerville, Caslon, Jenson, Times New Roman and Garamond.

The name roman is customarily applied uncapitalized distinguishing early Italian typefaces of the Renaissance period.

See also
 Gaelic type
 History of Western typography
 Serif

Notes

References 
 Bringhurst, Robert (2008), The Elements of Typographic Style (version 3.2). Vancouver: Hartley & Marks.  Often referred to simply as "Bringhurst", Elements is widely respected as the current English-language authority on typographic style.
 Nesbitt, Alexander The History and Technique of Lettering (1957), Dover Publications, Inc. . The Dover edition is an abridged and corrected republication of the work originally published in 1950 by Prentice-Hall, Inc. under the title Lettering: The History and Technique of Lettering as Design.

External links 
 

Typography